The Greater London Fund for the Blind is a British charity.  It was formed in 1921 by Sir Arthur Pearson to co-ordinate the raising of funds to improve the lives of blind and visually impaired people in London.

It runs an annual Geranium Day appeal, and operates a chain of Geranium shops in Greater London.  It is based at 12 Whitehorse Mews, on Westminster Bridge Road.

External links
Official website

Organizations established in 1921
Charities based in London
1921 establishments in England